René Laurin (4 February 1940 – 21 January 2023) was a Canadian politician who was a member of the House of Commons from 1993 to 2000.

Born in Joliette, Quebec, Laurin was a teacher in Joliette's public and secondary schools after receiving a certificate from Ignace-Bourget College in 1969. Previously, he received a Bachelor of Arts degree at Joliette Seminary, and a Bachelor of Science in Communication at École des Hautes Études commerciales de Montréal. Between 1969 and 1971 he was general director of the Nouvelle-Acanadie School Board in the Joliette district, after which he joined the Joliette School Board until 1993.

Laurin was elected in the Joliette electoral district under the Bloc Québécois party in the 1993 and 1997 federal elections, thus serving in the 35th and 36th Canadian Parliaments. Laurin did not seek a third term in Parliament and left Canadian politics in 2000. He then became mayor of Joliette, serving 12 years in that position until his retirement in 2013.

Laurin died on 21 January 2023, at the age of 82.

Electoral record

References

External links
 

1940 births
2023 deaths
Bloc Québécois MPs
French Quebecers
Mayors of places in Quebec
Members of the House of Commons of Canada from Quebec
People from Joliette
Canadian educators